Chellammal Women's College (Tamil:செல்லம்மாள் மகளிர் கல்லூரி) is affiliated to the University of Madras, is an Arts & Science Colleges in Guindy, Chennai, Tamil Nadu, India.

Courses

Shift I [Day]

Bachelor Courses
 Bachelor of Arts in Tamil
 Bachelor of Arts in English
 Bachelor of Arts in Economics
 Bachelor of Commerce
 Bachelor of Science in Chemistry
 Bachelor of Science in Zoology

Master Courses

 Master of Arts in Tamil

Shift II [Evening]

 Bachelor of Science in Computer Science
 Bachelor of Science in Mathematics
 Bachelor of Commerce (Corporate Secretaryship)
Bachelor of Commerce (General)
Bachelor of Commerce (Accounting Finance)
Bachelor of Business Administration
Master of Commerce (M.Com-General)
Master of Arts (M.A- English)

Notable alumni

 V. Revathi, COC Head, Thomson Press India Today

Facilities
 Library
 Sports
NSS
Rotaract Club

References

Women's universities and colleges in Chennai
Arts and Science colleges in Chennai
Educational institutions established in 1971
1971 establishments in Tamil Nadu
Colleges affiliated to University of Madras